The Northwest Correctional Complex is a state prison located in Tiptonville, Lake County, Tennessee. It is owned and operated by the Tennessee Department of Correction. The facility can hold 2,391 inmates at a range of security levels. It has the second largest capacity of any state prison in Tennessee after the Trousdale Turner Correctional Center. As of May 31, 2020, there were 1,958 in the facility. It is the primary educational prison in the state system. In addition, inmates provide more than 100,000 hours of community service to state and local governments, and non-profit agencies annually. 

In July 2015 eight NCC inmates sustained knife wounds in gang-related stabbings.  The prison, as well as the state's Northeast Correctional Complex, was put on lockdown.  The disturbances were attributed by The Tennessean to understaffing and a "severe manpower shortage" following Tennessee's decision to reconfigure correctional officers' schedules to save money on overtime.

In May 2020, it was reported that 394 cases of COVID-19 had been linked to the NCC. Specifically, 381 inmates and 13 staff at the prison had tested positive for the disease as of May 15. As of June 3, 2020 a total of 612 inmates and 28 staff members have tested positive; 382 of those inmates have recovered and 10 staff members have returned to work.

History 
The Lake County Regional Correctional Facility (now called Site 2 within the complex) opened in Tiptonville in 1981, with a capacity of 500 inmates. The Northwest Corrections Center opened on the site in 1992, and is called Site 1.

Notable inmates
Notable inmates incarcerated at the facility include:
 Letalvis Cobbins - convicted of the 2007 kidnapping, rape, and murders of Channon Christian and Christopher Newsom
 George Geovonni Thomas – convicted of the 2007 kidnapping, rape, and murders of Channon Christian and Christopher Newsom
 William Riley Gaul - convicted of the 2016 stalking and murder of Emma Jane Walker
 Jim Adkisson - convicted of the 2008 Knoxville Unitarian Universalist church shooting
 Joel Michael Guy, Jr - convicted of the 2016 murders of Joel and Lisa Guy, his parents.

References 

Prisons in Tennessee
Buildings and structures in Lake County, Tennessee
1981 establishments in Tennessee